Bone Eater is a 2008 American made-for-television monster movie directed and written by Jim Wynorski.  It stars Bruce Boxleitner as a sheriff who must stop a Native American monster from destroying his town.  It premiered on Syfy and was later released on DVD.

Plot 
An unscrupulous land developer, Dick Krantz, ignores the protests of Native Americans as he violates their ancestral burial grounds.  The local sheriff, Steve Evans, is caught in the middle of the conflict, as he is a quarter Native American and 3/4 Caucasian.  When one of Krantz's construction crews unearths an ancient relic, they unleash a giant skeletal monster that proceeds to kill everyone in its path.  Evans must deal with his rebellious daughter, unhelpful bureaucrats, and Johnny Black Hawk, a Native American who agitates for violence.  After consulting with the local chief, Storm Cloud, Evans learns he must locate the relic and use it in ritual combat against the monster.  Once Sheriff Evans acquires the relic, Johnny Black Hawk attempts to take it from him and use it to get vengeance on the town; Evans is forced to kill him in self-defense.  After donning war paint, Evans goes on to fight and ultimately defeat the Bone Eater.

Cast 
 Bruce Boxleitner as Sheriff Steve Evans
 Michael Horse as Chief Storm Cloud
 Adoni Maropis as Johnny Black Hawk
 Clara Bryant as Kelly Evans
 Gil Gerard as Big Jim Burns
 Jennifer Lee Wiggins as Kaya
 Walter Koenig as Coogan
 William Katt as Dr. Boombas
 Veronica Hamel as Commissioner Hayes
 Roark Critchlow as Deputy Roberts
 John Callahan as Seth Pomeroy

Release 
CineTel Films announced Bone Eater in 2006.  It premiered on Syfy on April 4, 2008, and Lionsgate released it on DVD on July 8, 2008.

Reception 
Scott Foy of Dread Central rated it 2/5 stars and wrote that the film would not "scare anyone except maybe the smallest of children".  Foy criticized the story as "pointless and derivative" and the effects as cartoonish, though he stated that the monster gives Bone Eater "moments of wacky charm".  David Johnson of DVD Verdict called it "astonishingly stupid" and described the title monster as "one of the most ridiculous CGI contraptions I've seen."  Justin Felix of DVD Talk rated the film 1/5 stars and stated "it has a it's so bad you have to see it to believe it vibe."  Bloody Disgusting rated the film 2.5/5 stars and called it "the ultimate Saturday morning mindwipe."

See also 
 List of Sci Fi Pictures original films

References

External links 
 
 

2008 television films
2008 horror films
2000s science fiction horror films
Syfy original films
American independent films
American science fiction horror films
Films directed by Jim Wynorski
2000s monster movies
Films about Native Americans
Films based on folklore
Folk horror films
Films set in California
2008 films
CineTel Films films
American monster movies
2000s American films